Vithusha also spelt as Vidusha commonly known by the nom de guerre Brigadier Vithusha  was a Sri Lankan Tamil rebel and member of the Liberation Tigers of Tamil Eelam (LTTE), a separatist Tamil militant organisation in Sri Lanka. She joined the LTTE after being deeply affected by the massacre of Tamils in the Kumudini boat massacre in 1985. She came from a Tamil Brahmin family, her brother Vithushan died in combat during battle with the Sri Lankan Army in Vilakkuvaithakulam in Vavuniya District in 1999. She received her training near Kilili as part of the Freedom Birds training program. She was in charge of stores during the IPKF operations. She got into combat and fought in an attack on the Jaffna Fort and she played a significant role in every military operation in which the women's brigade was involved. She was killed in combat in the Battle of Puthukkudiyirippu in 2009.

References

2009 deaths
Liberation Tigers of Tamil Eelam members
People from Northern Province, Sri Lanka
People killed during the Sri Lankan Civil War
Sri Lankan Tamil rebels